Clallam County is a county in the U.S. state of Washington. As of the 2020 census, the population was 77,155, with an estimated population of 78,209 in 2021. The county seat and largest city is Port Angeles; the county as a whole comprises the Port Angeles, WA Micropolitan Statistical Area. The name is a Klallam word for "the strong people". The county was formed on April 26, 1854. Located on the Olympic Peninsula, it is south from the Strait of Juan de Fuca, which forms the Canada–US border, as British Columbia's Vancouver Island is across the strait.

Geography

Located in Clallam County is Cape Alava, the westernmost point in both Washington and the contiguous United States, with a longitude of 124 degrees, 43 minutes and 59 seconds West (−124.733). Near Cape Alava is Ozette, the westernmost town in the contiguous United States. Clallam County also contains the west-northwesternmost, northwesternmost, and north-northwesternmost points in the contiguous United States.

Geographic features

Adjacent counties
 Capital Regional District, British Columbia – north
 Jefferson County – south & east

National protected areas
 Pacific Northwest National Scenic Trail (part)
 Dungeness National Wildlife Refuge
 Flattery Rocks National Wildlife Refuge
 Olympic National Forest (part)
 Olympic National Park (part)
 Quillayute Needles National Wildlife Refuge (part)

Demographics

2000 census
As of the census of 2000, there were 64,525 people, 27,164 households, and 18,064 families living in the county. The population density was 37 people per square mile (14/km2). There were 30,683 housing units at an average density of 18 per square mile (7/km2). The racial makeup of the county was 89.12% White, 0.84% Black or African American, 5.12% Native American, 1.13% Asian, 0.16% Pacific Islander, 1.18% from other races, and 2.44% from two or more races. 3.41% of the population were Hispanic or Latino of any race. 17.2% were of German, 13.1% English, 9.3% Irish, 8.3% United States or American and 6.0% Norwegian ancestry. 95% spoke English and 3.2% Spanish as their first language.

There were 27,164 households, out of which 25.70% had children under the age of 18 living with them, 53.90% were married couples living together, 9.00% had a female householder with no husband present, and 33.50% were non-families. 28.10% of all households were made up of individuals, and 13.40% had someone living alone who was 65 years of age or older. The average household size was 2.31 and the average family size was 2.78.

In the county, the population was spread out, with 22.00% under the age of 18, 7.10% from 18 to 24, 22.80% from 25 to 44, 26.90% from 45 to 64, and 21.30% who were 65 years of age or older. The median age was 44 years. For every 100 females there were 98.70 males. For every 100 females age 18 and over, there were 96.60 males.

The median income for a household in the county was $36,449, and the median income for a family was $44,381. Males had a median income of $35,452 versus $24,628 for females. The per capita income for the county was $19,517. About 8.90% of families and 12.50% of the population were below the poverty line, including 17.10% of those under age 18 and 6.80% of those age 65 or over.

2010 census
As of the 2010 census, there were 71,404 people, 31,329 households, and 19,713 families living in the county. The racial makeup of the county was 87.0% white, 5.1% American Indian, 1.4% Asian, 0.8% black or African American, 0.1% Pacific islander, 1.8% from other races, and 3.8% from two or more races. Those of Hispanic or Latino origin made up 5.1% of the population. In terms of ancestry, 21.4% were German, 16.4% were English, 12.6% were Irish, 6.5% were Norwegian, and 5.2% were American.

Of the 31,329 households, 22.7% had children under the age of 18 living with them, 49.4% were married couples living together, 9.2% had a female householder with no husband present, 37.1% were non-families, and 30.4% of all households were made up of individuals. The average household size was 2.22 and the average family size was 2.70. The median age was 49.0 years.

The median income for a household in the county was $44,398 and the median income for a family was $54,837. Males had a median income of $44,609 versus $32,125 for females. The per capita income for the county was $24,449. About 9.5% of families and 14.3% of the population were below the poverty line, including 21.4% of those under age 18 and 6.0% of those age 65 or over.

Politics
Modern Clallam County is generally regarded as a competitive area politically. In the 2020 presidential election, Democrat Joe Biden won with 50.2% of the vote versus 46.9% of the vote for Republican Donald Trump. In the 2016 presidential election, Republican Donald Trump won with 46.7% of the vote, compared to 44.0% of the vote for Democrat  Hillary Clinton. In the 2012 presidential election, Democrat Barack Obama narrowly won with 48.4% of the vote, compared to 48.0% of the vote for Republican Mitt Romney. In the 2008 presidential election,  Barack Obama won the county with 50.6% of the vote, compared to 47.3% for candidate Republican John McCain.

Clallam County is a bellwether, holding the longest record, as of 2020, for predicting official presidential election winners in the entire country. It has voted the winning candidate in every presidential election since 1980, and in every election since 1920 except for 1968 and 1976. As of 2020, it is the only county in the United States that has voted for the presidential winner in every election since 1980, and currently has the longest streak as a bellwether county in the United States.

Democratic candidates are generally most successful in the county seat and largest city, Port Angeles, which casts a significant number of votes. The city of Sequim and its general vicinity (excepting newer developments such as Bell Hill which tend to be Republican) is generally considered a battleground area. The Forks area is generally Republican, with the exception of American Indian areas. The Makah tribe areas around Neah Bay are some of the most Democratic areas in the state. Otherwise, with the exception of a few locations (such as Blyn and Jamestown near Sequim), unincorporated Clallam County has a strong Republican lean.

Transportation

Major highways
  U.S. Route 101

Airports
The following public use airports are located in the county:
 William R. Fairchild International Airport (CLM) – Port Angeles
 Forks Airport (S18) – Forks
 Quillayute Airport (UIL) – Quillayute / Forks
 Sekiu Airport (11S) – Sekiu
 Sequim Valley Airport (W28) – Sequim

Communities

Cities

Forks
Port Angeles (County seat)
Sequim

Census-designated places

 Bell Hill
 Blyn
 Carlsborg
 Clallam Bay
 Jamestown
 Neah Bay
 Port Angeles East
 River Road
 Sekiu

Unincorporated communities

 Agnew
 Beaver
 Crane
 Diamond Point
 Dungeness
 Elwha
 Fairholm
 Joyce
 La Push
 Maple Grove
 Ozette
 Pysht
 Piedmont
 Sappho
 Schoolhouse Point

Popular culture
The popular Twilight Saga novels and film series are set in Clallam County. The main storyline is set in Forks; however, the characters also visit neighboring Port Angeles.

The rural-comedy film series Ma and Pa Kettle (1949–1957) is set in a fictionalized Cape Flattery.

A popular YouTube series following the restoration of the historic sailing vessel Tally Ho takes place in Sequim since 2017 and often visits other places in Clallam County. The county has demanded that donations and work on the project be stopped, citing lack of permits and an unwillingness to issue those permits.

See also
 Clallam Transit
 National Register of Historic Places listings in Clallam County, Washington
 People's Wharf Company

References

External links

 North Olympic Library System
 Clallam County – Thumbnail History
 University of Washington Libraries Digital Collections – The Pacific Northwest Olympic Peninsula Community Museum A web-based museum showcasing aspects of the rich history and culture of Washington State's Olympic Peninsula communities. Features cultural exhibits, curriculum packets and a searchable archive of over 12,000 items that includes historical photographs, audio recordings, videos, maps, diaries, reports and other documents.

 
1854 establishments in Washington Territory
Populated places established in 1854
Washington placenames of Native American origin
Western Washington